Giulio Migliaccio (born 23 June 1981) is an Italian retired football midfielder. He started at lower league sides Savoia, Puteolana, Bari, Giugliano, and Ternana before later featuring for Atalanta, Palermo, and Fiorentina in the Serie A.

Club career
Migliaccio started his career at Savoia. He debuted as a professional during the 1998–99 season, playing in the Serie C championship, and making a total of 8 appearances. The following year he went on loan to Serie D club Puteolana. After an excellent season, his performances drew the attention of league leaders Bari, who bought Migliaccio ahead of the 2000–01 Serie A season. However, he never appeared for the club. The following year he was transferred to Giugliano in Serie C2.

In 2003, he moved to Ternana to play in Serie B. After 39 appearances, in January 2005 he moved to Atalanta during the 2004–05 Serie A season. He played three seasons with Atalanta, collecting 86 caps and 4 goals. His high quality performances during the 2006–07 season contributed to the club's excellent placement in the league.

Palermo
Migliaccio joined Palermo in the summer of 2007, and was strongly wanted by his former coach Stefano Colantuono. He was purchased for €5 million, plus the ownership of Adriano Pereira da Silva. In Palermo, Giulio became a pivotal player for the club in midfield, and a popular fan favourite, due to his commitment to the club and fighting spirit on the pitch. He was also occasionally lined up as a centre-back, first by Davide Ballardini and then, much more regularly, by Walter Zenga, Serse Cosmi and Devis Mangia. He was appointed Palermo vice-captain in 2011.

On 28 August 2010, he made his 100th appearance in the rosanero shirt: 93 appearances in the league, 4 in European competitions, and three in the Coppa Italia.

Fiorentina
On 31 August 2012, Migliaccio moved on loan to Fiorentina on the last day of the summer transfer window.

Atalanta
On 11 July 2013, Migliaccio completed a move to Atalanta B.C. from U.S. Città di Palermo. On 29 May 2017 he announced that he would retire at the end of the season.

International career
Between 2000 and 2002, Migliaccio was called up to the Italy national under-20 football team on 11 occasions, collecting 4 appearances.

Career statistics

Club

References

External links
 

1981 births
Living people
Association football midfielders
Association football defenders
Italian footballers
Sportspeople from the Province of Naples
Serie A players
Serie B players
Serie C players
Serie D players
A.C. Savoia 1908 players
S.S.C. Bari players
S.S.C. Giugliano players
Ternana Calcio players
Atalanta B.C. players
Palermo F.C. players
ACF Fiorentina players
Footballers from Campania